When Brooklyn Met Seville is a 2021 Spanish comedy film directed by Vicente Villanueva, which stars Carolina Yuste and Sergio Momo, also featuring Estefanía de los Santos and Manolo Solo. It blends elements of romantic comedy and family comedy.

Plot 
Facing eviction from her home in a rough Sevillian neighborhood, Carmen decides to scam an agency into renting a room to Ariel Brooklyn (an Afro-American foreign student from a well-off family) in exchange of €700. Meanwhile, Carmen's daughter, Ana, is desperate to leave the neighborhood.

Cast

Production 
Featuring a budget of around 2.6 million €, the film was produced by Capitán Araña and Pecado Films alongside 700 pavos AIE, with the participation of RTVE, Canal Sur and Movistar+, support from the Junta de Andalucía and funding from ICAA, ICO and Crea SGR. Shooting began in Alcalá de Guadaíra by July 2020.

Release 
The film was presented on 9 June 2021 at the 24th Málaga Spanish Film Festival (FCME), as part of the festival's official selection, but out of competition. Distributed by Filmax, the film was theatrically released in Spain on 17 September 2021.

Reception 
Anton Merikaetxebarria of El Correo gave the film 1 out of 3 stars, describing it as "typical costumbrista plot, full of clichés about the Andalusian people, in which bits of social criticism are inserted", otherwise highlighting Yuste's performance as the best thing about the film.

Declaring himself unable to withstand ten minutes of the film's tone and manners, Manuel J. Lombardo of Diario de Sevilla considered that the film exploits "the most stale clichés about class differences" in a sort of a "decaffeinated sainete".

Sergio F. Pinilla of Cinemanía gave the film 4½ out of 5 stars, considering it a "delicious" film "blending the idiosyncratic, miscegenation and class struggle" in which Villanueva finds "the right balance between hilarity, movement and emotion".

Pablo Vázquez of Fotogramas gave it 3 out of 5 stars, finding Yuste's performance to be the best of the film whereas negatively assessing "some somewhat questionable plot licenses" as the worst thing of the film.

Beatriz Martínez of El Periódico de Catalunya gave the film 3 out of 5 stars, considering it a "cocktail full of wit in which the overwhelming [presence of] Estefanía de los Santos, who plays the matriarch of the clan, becomes the real queen of the show".

Awards and nominations 

|-
| align = "center" rowspan = "4" | 2021 || rowspan = "4" | 34th ASECAN Awards || colspan = "2" | Best Film ||  || rowspan = "4" | 
|-
| Best Actor || Manolo Solo || 
|-
| Best Actress || Estefanía de los Santos || 
|-
| Best Original Score || Riki Rivera || 
|-
| align = "center" rowspan = "11" | 2022 || rowspan = "11" | 1st Carmen Awards || Best Fiction Feature Film || Pecado Films ||  || rowspan = "11" | 
|-
| Best Actress || Estefanía de los Santos || 
|-
| Best Original Score || Riki Rivera || 
|-
| Best Special Effects || Amparo Martínez || 
|-
| Best Makeup and Hairstyles || Anabel Beato & Carmela Martín || 
|-
| Best Art Direction || Lala Obrero || 
|-
| Best Sound || Antonio Rodríguez, Jorge Marín || 
|-
| Best New Actress || Andrea Haro || 
|-
| Best Editing || Ana Álvarez-Ossorio || 
|-
| Best Costume Design || Lourdes Fuentes || 
|-
| Best Supporting Actor || Manolo Solo || 
|}

See also 
 List of Spanish films of 2021

References

External links 
 When Brooklyn Met Seville at ICAA's Catálogo de Cinespañol

2020s Spanish-language films
Films set in Seville
Films shot in Andalusia
2021 films
Spanish comedy films
Films shot in the province of Seville
2021 comedy films
2020s Spanish films
Pecado Films films